Enrique Salgueiro Alonso (born 2 May 1981 in Redondela) is a Spanish former cyclist, who currently works as a directeur sportif for UCI Continental team .

Major results

2005
1st Overall Vuelta a León
1st Stage 2
2006
1st Stage 2 Tour des Pyrénées
2009
1st Stage 2 Cinturón a Mallorca
1st Stage 3 Vuelta a Extramadura
2010
1st Stage 5 Vuelta a León
2011
1st Stage 2 Trofeú Joaquim Agostinho

References

External links

1981 births
Living people
Spanish male cyclists
Sportspeople from Redondela
Cyclists from Galicia (Spain)